Kendua may refer to:

 Kendua, Tangail, Dhanbari Upazila, Tangail District, Bangladesh
 Kendua Upazila, an upazila in the Netrokona District of Dhaka, Bangladesh
 Kendua, West Bengal, a census town in Malda district, West Bengal, India